Count Mikhail Vielgorsky (1788-1856) was a Russian official and composer of Polish descent. He composed romances, symphonies, an opera and was an amateur singer, violinist, and patron of the arts. He is considered to be one of the major influences on the musical arts in Russia during the 19th-century because of his salons, responsible with bringing the string quartet to Russia. Along with his brother Matvey Vielgorsky, they were considered the "brothers of harmony" for their intrepid and comprehensive patronage of the musical arts.

Vielgorsky was a friend of Ludwig van Beethoven and an admirer of his music; the Russian premiere of Beethoven's Ninth Symphony took place at Vielgorsky's home in Saint Petersburg in 1836.  The same year, Mikhail Glinka rehearsed parts of his new opera A Life for the Tsar at Vielgorsky's home, accompanied by the enserfed orchestra of Prince Yusupov.  In the 1830s and 1840s, as Richard Stites notes, Vielgorsky's salon "played host to the most celebrated musical visitors to mid-century Russia: Liszt, Berlioz, the Schumanns, and Pauline Viardot among others ... Because of the attendance of Gogol, Zhukovsky, Vyazemsky, Lermontov, Odoevsky, Glinka, Dargomyzhsky, and Bryullov, a contemporary dubbed Vielgorsky's home "a lively and original multifaceted academy of the arts.'  Berlioz called it 'a little ministry of fine arts.'"

Vielgorsky presided over his salons with remarkable informality, donning simple garments and entertaining various different classes of guests in expert ease.

Childhood 
Vielgorsky was the son of Polish szlachcic [envoy] Jerzy Wielhorski, and the brother of Maciej Wielhorski (Matvey Valigorsky, 1794-1866), an amateur cellist who founded the Society of Lovers of Music with Prince Nikolai Borisovich Galitzin (also a friend of Beethoven) in 1828.

Education 
Mikhail Vielgorsky's special passion was music and was known to be an excellent performer and composer. And although an amateur, according to Schumann's opinion, he was "a genius amateur." He also had said that Vielgorsky was "the most ingenious dilettante I have ever known." Already in childhood, he showed outstanding musical abilities: he played the violin well and tried to compose. Vielgorski received a versatile musical education and studied music theory and harmony with the Spanish composer V. Martin-y-Soler, as well as composition with the German conductor and pianist Wilhelm Taubert. Back in 1804, when the whole family lived in Riga, Vielgorsky took part in family music-making in the evenings: the part of the first violin was performed by his father, the viola - by himself, and the cello part - by his brother Matvey, another outstanding musician-performer. Not limiting himself to the knowledge he had acquired, Vielgorsky continued his studies of composition in Paris with Luigi Cherubini, the famous Italian composer and Music Theorist.

Profession 
Mikhail Vielgorsky, alongside his compositional work and musicianship, acted as the Actual Privy Councilor to Catherine II or Catherine The Great.

Musician 
Experiencing a great interest in everything new, Vielgorsky met Ludwig van Beethoven in Vienna and was among the first eight listeners to perform his Symphony No.6 called the "Pastoral" symphony. Throughout his life, he remained an ardent admirer of the seminal, German composer.

He was one of the first in Russia to master large sonata-symphonic forms, writing two symphonies (the first was performed in 1825 in Moscow), a string quartet, and two overtures. He also created variations for Cello and Orchestra, pieces for piano, romances, vocal ensembles, as well as a number of choral works. Vielgorsky's romances became very popular in Russia and one of his romances ("I Loved") was readily performed by Mikhail Glinka. Vielgorsky noted that his opera "Gypsies" was based on a plot related to the events of the Patriotic War of 1812 (libretto by V. Zhukovsky and V. Sollogub).

Vielgorsky's house always became a kind of musical center. True connoisseurs of music gathered there and many compositions were performed for the first time. In Vielgorsky's home, Franz Liszt played for the first time from the sheet (from the score) Ruslana and Lyudmila by Glinka. Poet Dmitry Venevitinov called Vielgorsky's house "the academy of musical taste", while famous French composer Hector Berlioz, who came to Russia only twice, called his home "a small temple of fine arts". Vielgorsky managed to attract many musicians to his Luizino estate in the Kursk province, far from the life of the capital. In the 1820s, all nine of Beethoven's symphonies were performed on his estate during his evening salons. Vielgorsky highly appreciated Glinka's music and considered his opera Ivan Susanin, later more commonly named A Life for the Tsar, a masterpiece.

Vielgorsky provided support to many progressive figures in Russia. So, in 1838, together with the poet Vladimir Zhukovsky, he organized a lottery, the proceeds from which went to the ransom from the serfdom of the Ukrainian poet and outspoken political figure Taras Grigorovich Shevchenko.

Mikhail Vielgorsky died on September 9, 1856, in Moscow. His son-in-law Count V. Sollogub made an account of his mild and unassuming personality:

He is buried in the Lazarevskoye Cemetery of the Alexander Nevsky Lavra in St. Petersburg.

Friendship with Maria Sergeyevna Durnovo
Mikhail Vielgorsky knew Maria Sergeyevna Durnovo (Griboyedova), skilled piano performer and sister of famous Russian writer Alexander Griboyedov. According to the memoirs of Maria Durnovo: "Very often, the writer came to the sister's room. In the spring of 1823, whereas famed comedy remained a secret to public and majority of friends, Mikhail Vielgorsky, stumbled on several sheets of poem, written by the hand of Alexander Griboyedov, while assembling pages of sheet music on the piano of Maria Sergeyevna. Maria wanted to hide the accidentally discovered pages, but it was too late. The news of the new comedy rapidly spread around Moscow from the mouth of the well-known at the time musician". That poem was Woe from Wit, still considered to be "golden classic" in Russia and other Russian-speaking countries.

Family 
The first wife of Mikhail Vielgorsky was the maid of honor Catherine Biron (1793-1813), the niece of the last Duke of Courland. This marriage was facilitated by Empress Maria Feodorovna. The wedding took place in February 1812 in the Great Church of the Winter Palace. This marriage strengthened Vielgorsky's position at court.

In the memoirs of a contemporary, Ekaterina Biron is described as a sweet, naive child who loved lace and outfits. After the wedding, the Vielgorskys moved to Moscow, and soon Patriotic War began. Fleeing from the enemy, they left for one of their estates. In January 1813, the Vielgorskys decided to return to St. Petersburg. Catherine was in her last pregnancy. Their path lay through burnt-out Moscow. Having hardly reached Moscow, the Vielgorskys settled in the house of Prince Golitsyn, where Catherine died as a result of childbirth. Their relative wrote about this tragedy.

Second Marriage 
In 1816, Mikhail Vielgorsky secretly married the elder sister of his first wife Louise Biron (1791-1853), the maid of honor of the Empress Maria. Such a marriage according to church rules was considered illegal. By this, he incurred disgrace and was forced to leave for his estate Luizino in the Kursk province. The Vielgorskys lived in this estate for several years. Their children were born here:

 Joseph Mikhailovich (1817-1839), a friend of Gogol, died of consumption in Rome, his short life is devoted to the book and an excerpt of Gogol "Nights at the Villa."
 Apollinaria Mikhailovna (05.11.1818-1884), baptized on November 8, 1818, in the Church of the Ascension, goddaughter of Count GI Chernyshev and VI Lanskoy; since 1843 she has been married to A.V. Venevitinov, brother of the poet D.V. Venevitinov.
 Sofya Mikhailovna (1820-1878), since 1840 the wife of the writer V. A. Sollogub.
 Mikhail Mikhailovich (1822-21.11.1855), state councilor, full member of the Red Cross Society, from 1853 by the Imperial decree was called Count Vielgorsky-Matyushkin. Died of brain inflammation in Simferopol.
 Anna Mikhailovna (1823-1861), since 1858 the wife of Prince Alexander Ivanovich Shakhovsky (1822-1891). According to some memoirists, N.V. Gogol was in love with her. Gogol allegedly wanted to marry her, but knowing that L.K.Vielgorskaya would not agree to an unequal marriage for his daughter, he did not make an offer.

Compositions

Vocal Works 

 1885-1887: Collection of Russian Romances, for voice and piano
Бывало, for voice and piano 
Люблю я, for voice and piano
Два романса, for voice and piano
«Старый муж, грозный муж, for voice and piano
Ворон к ворону летит, for voice and piano
Чёрная шаль, for voice and piano
Кто три звёздах и три луне, for voice and piano

Opera 

 The Gypsy

Symphonies 

 Symphony No. 1 [?]
 Symphony No.2 [?]

Instrumental 

 String Quartet [?]

Choral 

 Canon in honor of Mikhail Glinka "Sing in ecstasy, Russian choir"

Orchestral works 

 Theme and Variations, for cello and orchestra

See also 

 List of Russian composers
 19th century in Russia
 Russian classical music

References

External links 

"Category:Wielhorski, Michał - IMSLP: Free Sheet Music PDF Download". imslp.org. Retrieved 2021-07-06.
Soloviev N.F.Vielgorsky, Mikhail Yurievich // Brockhaus and Efron Encyclopedic Dictionary: in 86 volumes (82 volumes and 4 additional). - SPb., 1890–1907.

1788 births
1856 deaths
Russian composers
Russian male composers
Burials at Lazarevskoe Cemetery (Saint Petersburg)
19th-century male musicians